Freyberg Pool is a public indoor swimming pool on Wellington Harbour, New Zealand. It is named for Bernard Freyberg, a World War I Victoria Cross recipient and Governor-General of New Zealand. 

A strong swimmer, he won the New Zealand 100-yards championship in 1906 and 1910. Freyberg died in 1963, the year the pool was opened, so it was decided to name it after him as he had trained at Te Aro baths which was previously at the site.

The building is classified as a "Category I" ("places of 'special or outstanding historical or cultural heritage significance or value'") historic place by the New Zealand Historic Places Trust. 

In 2011, along with the Michael Fowler Centre, it won an NZIA Enduring Architecture Award.

References 

Buildings and structures in Wellington City
Heritage New Zealand Category 1 historic places in the Wellington Region
1960s architecture in New Zealand
Swimming venues in New Zealand